The Hunt Memorial Library, also known as the John M. Hunt Memorial Building, is a historic former library building at 6 Main Street in downtown Nashua, New Hampshire.  Built in 1903, it is a significant early work of the renowned Gothic Revival architect Ralph Adams Cram, then in partnership with Goodhue and Ferguson.  The Nashua Public Library moved to a new building in 1971.  The building is owned by the city and is available for rent for functions.  It was listed on the National Register of Historic Places in 1971.

Description and history
The Hunt Memorial Building is located at the northern end of downtown Nashua, at the southeast corner of Main and Lowell Streets.  It is a multi-level structure built of brick laid in Flemish bond, with limestone trim.  Its three-story square tower is an imposing presence at the upper end of Main Street, with a staircase turret projecting from one corner.  The tower has buttressed corners and large Gothic-arched windows, and houses a four-face clock in its upper level.  It is topped by a crenellated parapet.  The main entrance is located at the base of the tower, in a Gothic-arched opening with heavy oaken double doors with book-leaf panels.

The building was constructed in 1903, and is an early work of architect Ralph Adams Cram, then early in a distinguished career.  Cram was a native of New Hampshire, and was during his career a major proponent of renewed interest in Gothic Revival architecture.   The Hunt Building includes good examples of the architectural vocabulary Cram developed for this role.  It was used as a library until 1971.

See also
National Register of Historic Places listings in Hillsborough County, New Hampshire

References

Library buildings completed in 1903
Libraries in Hillsborough County, New Hampshire
Libraries on the National Register of Historic Places in New Hampshire
Gothic Revival architecture in New Hampshire
Buildings and structures in Nashua, New Hampshire
Education in Nashua, New Hampshire
Historic district contributing properties in New Hampshire
National Register of Historic Places in Hillsborough County, New Hampshire